Oreochromis tanganicae, the Tanganyika tilapia, is a species of cichlid endemic to Lake Tanganyika and the mouths of its larger affluent rivers.  This species can reach a length of  SL.

References

Tang
Fish of Lake Tanganyika
Taxonomy articles created by Polbot
Fish described in 1894
Taxa named by Albert Günther